Labeo rectipinnis is a species of fish in the genus Labeo.

Its distribution is the lower reaches of the Congo River in Africa.

References 

Labeo
Taxa named by Sinaseli-Marcel Tshibwabwa
Fish described in 1997
Endemic fauna of the Democratic Republic of the Congo